A Gladue report is a type of pre-sentencing and bail hearing report that a Canadian court can request when considering sentencing an offender of Aboriginal background under Section 718.2(e) of the Criminal Code.

The process derives its name from R. v. Gladue, a 1999 Supreme Court of Canada decision that was the first to challenge Section 718.2(e) of the Criminal Code.

Gladue Principle

Subsection 718.2(e) is a guiding principle and not a substantive power. Therefore, the court is not at liberty to impose a sentence outside the range of legally available penalties. For example, if there is a minimum sentence of imprisonment, the court cannot use the Gladue Principle to impose a sentence lower than the minimum. However, courts have considered the Gladue Principle in determining the constitutionality of minimum sentences which are set by the Crown, depending on whether the Crown elects to serve a notice of enhanced penalty under s. 729 or elects to proceed by indictment.

In March 2012, the Supreme Court of Canada ruled that the Gladue Principle also applies to breaches of long-term supervision orders. They stated that "failing to take aboriginal circumstances into account would violate the fundamental principle of sentencing". This ruling, R v Ipeelee, 2012 SCC 13, [2012] 1 SCR 433, also reinforced the principles underlying the Gladue Report generally. Ipeelee itself has quickly become extremely influential in sentencing matters concerning aboriginal offenders, having been cited in over 80 Canadian court cases in just 7 months from the time it was issued and is now effectively a companion case to Gladue in this area.

R v. Gladue

Jamie Tanis Gladue was a young Cree woman charged with second-degree murder after stabbing her common-law husband during an altercation. On the evening of her nineteenth birthday celebration, Ms. Gladue confronted the victim, Reuben Beaver about the affair she believed he was having with her sister. Her suspicions appeared correct, and he insulted her. A few minutes later, the victim fled the home, and the accused ran at him with a large knife and stabbed him in the chest. At the trial, Ms. Gladue pleaded guilty to manslaughter as her blood alcohol content at the time of the incident was between 155 and 165 milligrams of alcohol in 100 millilitres of blood. Ms. Gladue's criminal record only consisted of an impaired driving conviction. Regarding her sentencing, the Supreme Court noted: "...a sentence of three years’ imprisonment was not unreasonable. More importantly, the accused was granted, subject to certain conditions, day parole after she had served six months in a correctional centre and, about a year ago, was granted full parole with the same conditions. The results of the sentence with incarceration for six months and the subsequent controlled release were in the interests of both the accused and society." Gladue was the first case to challenge section 718.2(e) before the courts. The accused's Aboriginal background did not affect sentencing. The trial judge noted that both Gladue and the victim were not living in an Aboriginal community at the time of the incident and therefore had no special circumstances arising from their Métis status. While Gladue was a Métis woman, she was living in an urban area at the time which affected the decision of the trial judge in applying section 718.2(e). Section 718.2(e) is often referred to as the "Aboriginal sentencing section."

Over-representation of Aboriginal People in Criminal Justice System
The amendment specifically aimed to address Aboriginal over-representation and stated that in order to determine an appropriate sentence, the judge must consider the background of the accused as these can often be mitigating factors. The Court found that the rate of incarceration for Aboriginal offenders was extremely high, and hoped that these amendments would provide some alternatives to imprisonment. Section 718.2(e) of the Canadian Criminal code was changed to dictate that "all available sanctions other than imprisonment that are reasonable in the circumstances should be considered for all offenders, with particular attention to the circumstances of aboriginal offenders". Allan Rock, Canada’s Minister of Justice at the time, explained that the amendment "aims to encourage courts to look at alternatives [which are] consistent with the protection of the public – alternatives to jail – and not simply resort to that easy answer in every case". Under this amendment, correctional decision makers must take into account Aboriginal social history in situations where their liberty is at stake. The factors include the effects of the residential school system, experience in the child welfare and adoption system, effects of dislocation and dispossession of Aboriginal peoples, level or lack of formal education and poverty and poor living conditions.

References

Law of Canada
Canadian Aboriginal and indigenous law
1999 introductions